Dysschema intermedium is a moth of the family Erebidae first described by Vitor Osmar Becker in 2013. It is found in Guatemala.

The length of the forewings is 35 mm for males and 37–40 mm for females. The wings of the males are translucent with irregular dark grey areas, dusted ferruginous underneath. The hindwings have a grey costa, dusted with reddish. Females have dark grey forewings with light whitish areas, dusted with grey. The hindwings are orange red with markings similar to those found on the males.

Etymology
The species name is derived from Latin intermedium (meaning intermediate).

References

Moths described in 2013
Dysschema